The 8th Floor is an exhibition and event space established by  Donald and Shelley Rubin in 2010. It is located at 17 West 17th Street in Manhattan's Chelsea neighborhood in the same building as the Rubin Museum. The space features a rotating selection of artists and exhibitions, many with a focus on social justice. In 2019 they launched a series of two-year exhibits under the theme Revolutionary Cycles.

References

External links

Organizations established in 2010
Chelsea, Manhattan
Art museums and galleries in New York City